Hellmann Worldwide Logistics SE & Co. KG is a German logistics services company with its head office in Osnabrück, Germany. In 2000 the company had 300 offices located on five of the six inhabited continents. It is a family-owned company.

History
Since its foundation in 1871 by Carl Heinrich Hellmann, the company has developed into one of the largest international logistics providers. In 2018, the Hellmann Group, with around 10,700 employees in 257 branches in 56 countries, achieved sales of around EUR 2.54 billion. Through its partner network, the company is represented worldwide with around 20,500 employees in 489 offices in 173 countries. The range of services includes rail, air and sea freight.

References

External links

Official Website
Moving Company

Logistics companies of Germany
Companies based in Lower Saxony
Osnabrück